Michael O'Loughlin (12 February 1876 – 6 May 1905) was an  Australian rules footballer who played with Essendon and St Kilda in the Victorian Football League (VFL). He died at the age of 29 from acute pneumonia and bronchitis.

Notes

External links 
		

1876 births
1905 deaths
Australian rules footballers from Melbourne
Essendon Football Club players
St Kilda Football Club players
Brunswick Football Club players
Deaths from pneumonia in Victoria (Australia)
Deaths from bronchitis
People from Brunswick, Victoria